The Bedford Open also known as the Bedford Lawn Tennis Open Tournament  was men's and women's grass court tennis tournament established in 1880 as the Bedfordshire LTC Tournament. It was held at the Bedford Lawn Tennis Club, Bedford, Berkshire, England and ran through until 1974 when it was abolished.

History 
The first Bedfordshire Lawn Tennis Club evolved out of a croquet club established in June 1871 by the Brooks family of Flitwick Manor.  The first tournament tennis  was played there on 29 August 1876, one year before the first Wimbledon Championships were held.  Records show that the field consisted of six pairs, the final grouping included a Mr G. Tylecote and Miss P. Hodgson who beat Mr. and Mrs. Cobbe in the mixed doubles.

By 1879 at least two lawn tennis clubs had been established in Bedfordshire, the South Bedfordshire Lawn Tennis Club (LTC), that usually staged tennis events at Flitwick Manor, Wrest Park, Silsoe and Cranfield Court. The North Bedfordshire LTC had courts at Sutton Manor, Sutton and Sandye Place.   Between 1884 and 1885 both the North and South Bedfordshire LTCs had ceased to operate. Between 1882 and 1884 a new Bedfordshire LTC was established at Bedford on land next to Bedford College. The current Bedford LTC based at at Bradgate Road (f.1890), is thought to be the successor club to Bedfordshire LTC.

From 1880 the South Bedfordshire LTC organised three recorded tournaments held at Fairfield Park, Stotfold, and two editions at Blunham House, Blunham, Bedford. In July 1882 a second edition of a Bedfordshire tournament was held on 18 July that year. On 28 August the Bedfordshire LTC had concluded an tournament the gentleman's singles was won by Mr. A. Payne, the ladies singles was won by Miss. A. Lindsell and the veteran's singles was won by a Reverend H. B. Allen.

In 1891 the Bedford Open was founded. In July 1939 the tournament held its 48th annual open event. this event ran through till 1966 before it ceased. In 1974 the tournament was revived for one edition only. This highly popular event was a regular stop on the senior worldwide tour for many years. Former winners of the men's single's title has included; Alan Stedman, Nigel Sharpe, John Bromwich, Erik Bjerre, Ignacy Tłoczyński, Peter Cawthorn, Czeslaw Spychala, Mike Davies, Bobby Wilson, Frew McMillan,  Keith Diepraam, Alan Mills  and Alberto Esplugas. The previous winners of the women's singles title has included; Evelyn Blencowe, Ruth Pennington-Legh Winch, Phyllis Satterthwaite, Phoebe Holcroft Watson, Elsie Goldsack Pittman, Gem Hoahing,  Lorna Cornell,  Rita Bentley, and Angela Mortimer.

Venue
The Bedford Open Tennis Tournament was held continuously for 76 years at the Bedford Lawn Tennis Club. In the late 1990s Bedford LTC which then consisted of 10 grass courts and 2 hard courts, had to move from its Bradgate road grounds due to the land being redeveloped.  The club moved to new premises at Chester Road, Bedford, where it still operates today.

Finals

Men's Singles
(incomplete roll)

Women's Singles
(incomplete roll)

References

Defunct tennis tournaments in the United Kingdom
Grass court tennis tournaments